Mason Airport may refer to:

 Mason Jewett Field in Mason, Michigan, United States (FAA: TEW)
 Mason City Municipal Airport in Mason City, Iowa, United States (FAA/IATA: MCW)
 Fleming-Mason Airport in Flemingsburg, Kentucky, United States (FAA: FGX)

See also 
 Mason County Airport (disambiguation)